Gereb Segen is a reservoir located in the Inderta woreda of the Tigray Region in Ethiopia. The earthen dam that holds the reservoir was built in 2016 by the Tigray Water Bureau, with the main aim of providing Mekelle with water.

Challenges 
In 2018-2019 the reservoir was unable to sustain the water needs of Mekelle
 Pipe diameters are underfit
 Leakage through the abutment

 Sediment deposition by May Gabat river

Irrigation 
Though the reservoir was not intended for irrigation, its seepage water is used in the downstream valley for irrigation. The lithology of the catchment is Antalo Limestone. Part of the water is lost through seepage; the positive side-effect is that this contributes to groundwater recharge, and it allows irrigation by the downstream communities.

Homonymous places 
There is a (much smaller) reservoir with the same name, some 20 km to the southeast: Gereb Segen (Hintalo).

References 

Reservoirs in Ethiopia
2016 establishments in Ethiopia
Tigray Region
Agriculture in Ethiopia
Water in Ethiopia